The 1957 UC Santa Barbara Gauchos football team represented University of California, Santa Barbara (UCSB) during the 1957 NCAA College Division football season.

UCSB competed in the California Collegiate Athletic Association (CCAA). The team was led by second-year head coach Ed Cody, and played home games at La Playa Stadium in Santa Barbara, California. They finished the season with a record of six wins and two losses (6–2, 1–1 CCAA).

Schedule

Team players in the NFL
The following UC Santa Barbara Gaucho players were selected in the 1958 NFL Draft.

Notes

References

UC Santa Barbara
UC Santa Barbara Gauchos football seasons
UC Santa Barbara Gauchos football